The lime leaf miner (Phyllonorycter issikii) is a moth of the family Gracillariidae. It is native to Japan, Korea and eastern Russia, but was probably introduced to eastern Europe around 1970. It is now widespread in the Czech Republic and Slovakia and is expanding its range in Hungary and Germany. It has also been recorded from the Baltic states and also the Benelux in 2009.

The wingspan is 7-7.5 mm. Adults are on wing from the end of June to mid-July and from the end of July to the end of August in two generations.

The larvae feed on Tilia americana, Tilia cordata and Tilia platyphyllos. They mine the leaves of their host plant. They create a lower-surface, somewhat contracted tentiform mine. There are often several mines in a single leaf. The frass is concentrated in a corner of the mine, recognisable from above as a black patch.

External links
Fauna Europaea
Leafminers and plant galls of Europe 
Lepiforum.de

issikii
Moths of Europe
Moths of Asia
Moths described in 1963